Patrick Carter may refer to:

 Patrick Carter, Baron Carter of Coles (born 1946), chairman of the review panel examining the future of NHS pathology
 Patrick Carter (American football) (born 1985), American football wide receiver
 Pat Carter (born 1966), American football tight end